In mathematical finite group theory, the Dade isometry is an isometry from class function on a subgroup H with support on a subset K of H to class functions on a group G .

Definitions

Suppose that H is a subgroup of a finite group G,  K is an invariant subset of H such that if two elements in K are conjugate in G, then they are conjugate in H, and π a set of primes containing all prime divisors of the orders of elements of K.  The Dade lifting is a linear map f → fσ from class functions f of H with support on K to class functions fσ of G, which is defined as follows:  fσ(x) is  f(k) if there is an element k ∈ K conjugate to the π-part of x, and 0 otherwise.
The Dade lifting is an isometry if for each k ∈ K, the centralizer CG(k) is the semidirect product of a normal Hall π' subgroup I(K) with CH(k).

Tamely embedded subsets in the Feit–Thompson proof

The Feit–Thompson proof of the odd-order theorem uses "tamely embedded subsets" and an isometry from class functions with support on a tamely embedded subset. If K1 is a tamely embedded subset, then the subset K consisting of K1 without the identity element 1 satisfies the conditions above, and in this case the isometry used by Feit and Thompson is the Dade isometry.

References

Finite groups
Representation theory